Hebron Methodist Church is a historic Methodist church located near Oakville, Warren County, North Carolina. It was built about 1848–1849, and is a one-story, three bay by three bay, Greek Revival style frame church. It has a gable roof and rests on a stone foundation. It was enlarged in 1886.  The building is attributed to local builder Jacob W. Holt (1811-1880).

It was added to the National Register of Historic Places in 1984.

References

Methodist churches in North Carolina
Churches on the National Register of Historic Places in North Carolina
Churches completed in 1848
19th-century Methodist church buildings in the United States
Buildings and structures in Warren County, North Carolina
National Register of Historic Places in Warren County, North Carolina